Amar Latif (born December 1974) is a Scottish entrepreneur, television personality and professional traveller. His blindness is due to the incurable eye condition retinitis pigmentosa. By his late teens he had 95 per cent sight loss.

Education and early career
Born and raised in Glasgow, Latif gained a Bachelor of Science in Mathematics, Statistics and Finance at the University of Strathclyde, spending part of his course in Canada at Queen's University in Kingston, Ontario. On leaving university, he trained as an accountant, eventually becoming Head of Commercial Finance for British Telecom.

In 2004, Latif founded Traveleyes, a travel agency specialising in tours for blind and partially-sighted travellers.

Media career

Latif directed the 2007 Channel 4 documentary Sightseeing Blind. He has had minor acting roles in the BBC Three comedy series It's Adam and Shelley, and the BBC One drama series Love Soup. In 2007, he appeared as a special guest on the BBC Two cookery show Ready Steady Cook. In 2016, he appeared as a tour guide in Channel 4's The Last Leg Goes Down Under.

From 2017 to 2018, Latif and Anna Richardson co-presented the Channel 4 show How to Get Fit Fast, which aired for two series.

In 2019, Latif and Sara Pascoe featured in the BBC Two documentary Travelling Blind, in which they explored Istanbul's Grand Bazaar, remote Black Sea-bordering mountains, traditional summer oil wrestling festivities, traditional alpine cattle and bee farming methods and Cappadocia rock formations.

In 2020, Latif appeared as the first ever blind contestant on Celebrity Masterchef.

In 2021, Amar was one of seven celebrity participants trekking the Sultans Trail in BBC One's Pilgrimage: The Road to Istanbul.

Patronship and awards
Latif won the 2005 Outstanding Young Business Entrepreneur of the World and Outstanding Young Person of the UK, both awarded by the Junior Chamber International; the 2006 One Vision Man of the Year; and the University of Strathclyde's 2006 Alumnus of the Year award. In 2007, he was presented with the inaugural Stelios Disabled Entrepreneur Award, presented by EasyJet founder Sir Stelios Haji-Ioannou in partnership with the charity Leonard Cheshire Disability.

A 2018 episode of the BBC documentary series River Walks, presented by Latif, was awarded both the Single Documentary category at the 2019 Royal Television Society Yorkshire Centre Awards and the Best Documentary award at the 2019 O2 Media Awards for Yorkshire and The Humber.

In July 2020 Latif was appointed as one of the first two celebrity patrons of SeeAbility, a charity working with people with learning disabilities, autism and sight loss.

In February 2022 Latif presented a BBC Radio 4 Appeal for Rafiki Thabo Foundation about a blind young girl in Uganda who, as he says in this personal message, touched his heart deeply, shortly after he was announced as patron for the charity. The charity works to remove barriers to education for vulnerable children in Kenya, Uganda and Lesotho, including those living with disabilities.

References

External links

1974 births
Living people
Scottish male television actors
British television directors
British Telecom people
Alumni of the University of Strathclyde
British blind people
Businesspeople from Glasgow
British people of Pakistani descent
Television presenters with disabilities